Thielbek was a  cargo steamship that was built in Germany in 1940, sunk in an air raid in 1945, refloated in 1949 and repaired, and was in service until 1974. Lübecker Maschinenbau Gesellschaft in Lübeck built her in 1940 for the Knöhr and Burchard shipping company of Hamburg. In 1961 Knöhr and Burchard sold her to buyers who renamed her Magdalene and registered her in Panama. In 1965 she was renamed Old Warrior. She was scrapped in Yugoslavia in 1974.

Thielbek is notable for having been sunk by RAF aircraft on 3 May 1945, killing 2,750 people aboard. At the time Cap Arcona and Thielbek were crowded with prisoners from the Neuengamme, Stutthof, and Mittelbau-Dora concentration camps.

Under Allied interrogation, the commander of the Gestapo in Hamburg later revealed that the prisoners were to be killed, possibly by scuttling the ships with the prisoners still aboard.

Background
On 17 April 1945 Thielbek was told she was to prepare for a "special operation". The next day the SS summoned Thielbeks Captain John Jacobsen, and Cap Arconas Captain Heinrich Bertram to a conference at which they were ordered to embark concentration camp prisoners. Both captains refused, and Jacobsen was relieved of his command.

The order to transfer the prisoners from the camps to the prison ships came from Hamburg Gauleiter Karl Kaufmann, who in turn was acting on orders from Berlin. Kaufmann later claimed during a War Crimes Tribunal that the prisoners were destined for Sweden, but at the same trial Georg-Henning Graf von Bassewitz-Behr, the Higher SS and Police Leader (HSSPF) of Hamburg, said that the prisoners were in fact to be killed on Himmler's orders.

Embarkation of prisoners began on 20 April, with the Swedish Red Cross present. The ship's water supply was insufficient for so many people and 20 to 30 prisoners died daily. The prisoners, with the exception of political prisoners, remained aboard for two or three days before being transferred to Cap Arcona by the cargo ship .

Sinking

Between the two attacks on Cap Arcona, nine Hawker Typhoon aircraft of No. 198 Squadron RAF stationed at Plantlünne attacked Thielbek and Deutschland, five aircraft firing rockets at Deutschland and 4 at Thielbek. Numerous cannon shells and 32 rockets were fired at Thielbek. She caught fire, developed a 30 degree list to starboard, and sank 20 minutes after being attacked. Of the 2,800 prisoners aboard Thielbek, only 50 survived the attack.

Subsequent career
In 1949, four years after her sinking, Thielbek was refloated. Human remains found aboard her were buried in the Cap Arcona cemetery at Neustadt in Holstein. She remained in Knöhr and Burchard service until 1961 when she was sold, renamed Magdalene, and registered under the Panamanian flag of convenience. In 1965 she was renamed Old Warrior. She was scrapped in Split, Yugoslavia in 1974.

See also

List of maritime disasters

Notes

References

External links

1940 ships
1945 in Germany
Bay of Lübeck
Maritime incidents in May 1945
Merchant ships of West Germany
Military scandals
Nazi war crimes in Germany
Ships sunk by British aircraft
Steamships of Germany
Steamships of West Germany
World War II massacres
World War II merchant ships of Germany
World War II shipwrecks in the Baltic Sea